The 2020 Metro Atlantic Athletic Conference men's basketball tournament was the postseason men's basketball tournament for the Metro Atlantic Athletic Conference for the 2019–20 NCAA Division I men's basketball season, played at the Jim Whelan Boardwalk Hall in Atlantic City, New Jersey for the first time in MAAC history. The tournament was cancelled on March 12, 2020 due to the COVID-19 pandemic. Already underway at the time of the announcement, the tournament was stalled in the midst of the quarterfinals, with Siena and St. Peter's having already qualified for the semifinals. This would have given the Saints their first NCAA Tournament Bid since 2010, when they won three straight MAAC Tournaments. However, the NCAA cancelled the tournament later in the day.

The defending champions were the Iona Gaels.

Seeds
All 11 teams in the conference participate in the Tournament. The top five teams received byes to the quarterfinals. Teams were seeded by record within the conference, with a tiebreaker system to seed teams with identical conference records.

Schedule

Bracket

* denotes number of overtimes

Game summaries

First round

Quarterfinals

See also
 2020 MAAC women's basketball tournament

References

Tournament
2020
MAAC men's basketball tournament
College basketball tournaments in New Jersey
Sports competitions in Atlantic City, New Jersey
2020 in sports in New Jersey
March 2020 sports events in the United States